Glossidae is a family of saltwater clams in the superfamily Glossoidea.

Genera and species
Genera and species within the family Glossidae include:
Glossocardia Stoliczka, 1870
Glossocardia agassizii (Dall, 1889)
Glossus
Glossus humanus Linnaeus, 1758 – oxheart clam
Meiocardia H. and A. Adams, 1857
Meiocardia vulgaris (Reeve, 1845)

References

 
Bivalve families